Omanu is a beach and suburb in Mount Maunganui, Tauranga, in the Bay of Plenty Region of New Zealand's North Island.

The white sandy beach is accessible via several public walkways through the dunes. It is a popular place to swim, surf and walk, and hosts surf lifesaving competitions.

A surf lifesaving club was established at Omanu in 1947 to patrol the beach. It is now the largest surf club in Bay of Plenty, and has the largest children's nippers programme in New Zealand.

Between July 2014 and December 2015, Omanu recorded the most burglaries of any suburb in Tauranga. Police say many of the thieves are opportunists.

The club also patrolled Papamoa Beach until a new club was established there in 1990.

A new club house was proposed in 2002 and completed in June 2006.

Tauranga City Council monitors erosion at the beach regularly and replenishes sand every year.

Demographics

Omanu Beach had a population of 2,919 at the 2018 New Zealand census, an increase of 300 people (11.5%) since the 2013 census, and an increase of 345 people (13.4%) since the 2006 census. There were 1,104 households, comprising 1,371 males and 1,545 females, giving a sex ratio of 0.89 males per female. The median age was 40.2 years (compared with 37.4 years nationally), with 582 people (19.9%) aged under 15 years, 471 (16.1%) aged 15 to 29, 1,347 (46.1%) aged 30 to 64, and 519 (17.8%) aged 65 or older.

Ethnicities were 91.7% European/Pākehā, 10.9% Māori, 1.7% Pacific peoples, 3.0% Asian, and 3.5% other ethnicities. People may identify with more than one ethnicity.

The percentage of people born overseas was 19.9, compared with 27.1% nationally.

Although some people chose not to answer the census's question about religious affiliation, 58.0% had no religion, 31.7% were Christian, 0.2% had Māori religious beliefs, 0.2% were Hindu, 0.2% were Muslim, 0.3% were Buddhist and 2.4% had other religions.

Of those at least 15 years old, 615 (26.3%) people had a bachelor's or higher degree, and 345 (14.8%) people had no formal qualifications. The median income was $37,400, compared with $31,800 nationally. 531 people (22.7%) earned over $70,000 compared to 17.2% nationally. The employment status of those at least 15 was that 1,161 (49.7%) people were employed full-time, 405 (17.3%) were part-time, and 78 (3.3%) were unemployed.

Education

References

Suburbs of Tauranga